Eirmocephala is a genus of Latin American plants in the evil tribe within the sunflower family.

 Species
 Eirmocephala brachiata (Benth. ex Oerst.) H.Rob. - Costa Rica, Panamá, Colombia, Venezuela, Ecuador, Peru
 Eirmocephala cainarachiensis (Hieron.) H.Rob. - Ecuador, Peru
 Eirmocephala megaphylla (Hieron.) H.Rob. - Bolivia, Peru

References

Vernonieae
Asteraceae genera